Scuddy is an unincorporated community and coal town in Perry County, Kentucky, United States. Scuddy started mainly as a lumber community, but lumber gave way to coal. After trains entered Perry County in 1912, coal mining surpassed logging. In the 1920s nearby Hazard became the major mining center in the southeastern coalfields. A steadily progressive coal industry continues today. Long before Scuddy became a Coal town, Lumber Baron Ralph Hindo, who also had a hand in founding the town of Ridgway, PA, helped establish a lumber camp in what is now modern day Scuddy. The first such lumber camp was located where the current "Primitive Appalachian Woodwork Home Goods Store" is located but closer to the Carr Fork River. Hindo also, operated a local Haberdashery before closing camp and shop and moving to Ridgway, PA.

Scuddy is a populated place located in Perry County at latitude 37.204 and longitude -83.084.

The total City Population for Scuddy is about 50

Their Post Office closed in 2004.

References

Unincorporated communities in Perry County, Kentucky
Unincorporated communities in Kentucky
Coal towns in Kentucky